In probability and statistics, a realization, observation, or observed value, of a random variable is the value that is actually observed (what actually happened). The random variable itself is the process dictating how the observation comes about. Statistical quantities computed from realizations without deploying a statistical model are often called "empirical", as in empirical distribution function or empirical probability.

Conventionally, to avoid confusion, upper case letters denote random variables; the corresponding lower case letters denote their realizations.

Formal definition 
In more formal probability theory, a random variable is a function X defined from a sample space Ω to a measurable space called the state space. If an element in Ω is mapped to an element in state space by X, then that element in state space is a realization. Elements of the sample space can be thought of as all the different possibilities that could happen; while a realization (an element of the state space) can be thought of as the value X attains when one of the possibilities did happen. Probability is a mapping that assigns numbers between zero and one to certain subsets of the sample space, namely the measurable subsets, known here as events. Subsets of the sample space that contain only one element are called elementary events. The value of the random variable (that is, the function) X at a point ω ∈ Ω,

is called a realization of X.

See also
Errors and residuals
Outcome (probability)
Random variate
Raw data

Notes

References

Statistical data types